The Oslo Mosquito raid (25 September 1942) was a British air raid on Oslo, Norway, during the Second World War. The target of the raid was the Victoria Terrasse building, the headquarters of the Gestapo. It was intended to be a "morale booster" for the Norwegian people and was scheduled to coincide with a rally of Norwegian collaborators, led by Vidkun Quisling. The raid is also known for it being the moment when the Royal Air Force revealed the existence of the Mosquito aircraft to the British public, when the BBC Home Service reported on the raid the following day.

Preparation
The operation was carried out by four de Havilland Mosquito aircraft of No. 105 Squadron RAF, led by Squadron Leader George Parry, flying with navigator Flying Officer "Robbie" Robson. The other three crews consisted of:
 Flight Lieutenant Pete Rowland and Flying Officer Richard Reilly
 Flying Officer Alec Bristow and Pilot Officer Bernard Marshall
 Flight Sergeant Gordon Carter and Sergeant William Young.

In order to shorten the mission distance, the four aircraft were flown to RAF Leuchars in Fife, Scotland, where they were refuelled and loaded with four delayed action  bombs each.

The operation
Each aircraft was armed with four 500 lb bombs with 11 second delayed action fuses since in such a low level attack the bombs had the potential to damage the aircraft that dropped them.

Despite their low altitude, the Mosquitos were intercepted by two Focke-Wulf Fw 190 fighters of 3/JG 5 flying from Stavanger, causing Gordon Carter's Mosquito to make a forced landing in Oslofjord. Rowland and Reilly were pursued by the other Fw 190 until it clipped a tree and was forced to break off the attack.

At least four bombs penetrated the Gestapo HQ; one failed to detonate, while the other three crashed out through the opposite wall before exploding. The building was not destroyed, but several civilian residences were, and 80 civilians were killed or injured. The Norwegian government in exile, which had not known about the raid, later expressed serious concern to the British government. Official announcements by the German occupation forces claimed that several British aircraft had been shot down, when in reality a single Mosquito had been lost.

Impact
Although the raid had failed to achieve its objective, it was considered dramatic enough to be used to reveal the existence of the Mosquito to the British public, and the following day (26 September) listeners to the BBC Home Service learned that a new aircraft – the Mosquito – had been revealed for the first time by the RAF, and that four had made a low level attack on Oslo. The Mosquito bomber was featured in The Times on 28 September, and the next day the newspaper published two captioned photographs illustrating the Oslo bomb strikes and damage.

See also
Aarhus Air Raid, a similar attack on Gestapo headquarters in Aarhus, Denmark
Operation Carthage, a similar attack on Gestapo headquarters in Copenhagen, Denmark, with 125 off-target civilian casualties
Operation Jericho, a similar attack on Amiens Prison in France

References
Notes

Bibliography

 Bowman, Martin. Mosquito Fighter/Fighter-bomber Units of World War 2. Oxford, UK: Osprey Publishing, 1998. .
 Dahl, Hans Fredrik and Anne-Marie Stanton-Ife (translator). Quisling: A Study in Treachery. New York: Cambridge University Press, 1999. .

External links
 IWM Interview with George Parry
 IWM Interview with Bernard Marshall

World War II aerial operations and battles of the Western European Theatre
Aerial operations and battles of World War II involving the United Kingdom
Conflicts in 1942
History of the Royal Air Force during World War II
1942 in Norway
History of Oslo
De Havilland Mosquito
1940s in Oslo
Germany–United Kingdom military relations
Norway–United Kingdom military relations
September 1942 events